The Little Mackinaw River is an  river in the U.S. state of Illinois. It is a tributary of the Mackinaw River, which it joins near Hopedale in Tazewell County. The river's name is derived from the Ojibwe word mikinaak meaning "turtle".

Cities, towns and counties
The following cities, towns and villages are drained by the Little Mackinaw:
Danvers
Hopedale

The following Illinois counties are in part drained by the Little Mackinaw:
McLean
Tazewell

See also
List of Illinois rivers

References

Tributaries of the Illinois River
Rivers of McLean County, Illinois
Rivers of Illinois
Rivers of Tazewell County, Illinois

fr:Liste des fleuves de l'Illinois
nl:Lijst van rivieren in Illinois